Aestivation may refer to:

 Aestivation, a state of animal dormancy, similar to hibernation
 Aestivation (botany), the positional arrangement of the parts of a flower within a flower bud before it has opened
 Aestivation hypothesis, a hypothesized solution to the Fermi paradox